The Medal for Lifesaving is a medal of Ukraine presented for saving human life, acts of charity, humanistic and other activities in public health, and accident prevention.  The medal was established 20 May 2008 by presidential decree № 461.

Appearance
The obverse of the medal depicts the image of two hands, one extended to rescue the other. The hands are gold plated. The image is superimposed over the sun with rays, symbolizing life saved. Around the edge of the medal is inscribed "За врятоване життя" (Medal for Lifesaving).

The ribbon bar of the medal is a rectangular metal bar covered with the medal's ribbon.

References

External links
Presidential Decree № 461/2008 

Orders, decorations, and medals of Ukraine
2008 establishments in Ukraine
Awards established in 2008